Dudu Georgescu (born 1 September 1950) is a retired Romanian footballer who played as a forward and a former coach.

Club career
Dudu Georgescu was born in Bucharest on 1 September 1950. He started his career at Progresul București, making his Divizia A debut in a 3–0 victory against Universitatea Craiova in which he played as a central defender. After playing for Progresul in the first two leagues for a few years, he went to play for a short while at CSM Reșița, where he scored 7 goals in 12 Divizia A games, including a double in a 4–1 victory against Dinamo București, which convinced The Red Dogs to transfer him. His Dinamo București spell, consisted of 10 Divizia A seasons in which he won four league titles in which he was the team's top goalscorer in the first three and one cup in which he scored two goals in the 1982 final which ended with a 3–2 victory against FC Baia Mare. Georgescu also made some notable individual performances as being four consecutive times from 1975 until 1978 the Divizia A top goalscorer, winning also the European Golden Shoe in 1975 (33 goals) and 1977 (47 goals) for the top goalscorer of Europe. Georgescu won the Romanian Footballer of the Year award in 1976 and was nominated three times for the Ballon d'Or. With 207 goals scored (including 9 in the derby against Steaua București) in 260 Divizia A matches, Georgescu is Dinamo București's all time leading goalscorer, he also played 23 matches and scored 17 goals in European competitions for the club. After his period spent at Dinamo București, Georgescu went to play for Bacău, Gloria Buzău and Flacăra Moreni, obtaining a record of 252 goals scored in 371 Divizia A games. Georgescu ended his career in 1988 after playing two seasons in Divizia C for Muscelul Câmpulung and Unirea Urziceni.

International career
Dudu Georgescu played 40 matches and scored 21 goals for Romania (44/21 including Romania's Olympic team games), making his debut on 14 September 1973 under coach Valentin Stănescu in Romania's biggest ever victory, a 9–0 against Finland, in which he scored one goal at the 1974 World Cup qualifiers. He scored four goals in five matches at the Euro 1976 qualifiers, made three appearances in which he scored two goals at the 1977–80 Balkan Cup, played four games and scored two goals at the 1978 World Cup qualifiers, two appearances and two goals scored in a 2–2 against Spain at the Euro 1980 qualifiers and made one appearance at each of the 1982 World Cup qualifiers and the 1984 Euro qualifiers. Georgescu's last game for the national team was a friendly which ended with a 1–0 victory against China.

International goals
Scores and results list Romania's goal tally first, score column indicates score after each Georgescu goal.

Honours

Club
Progresul București
Divizia B: 1969–70
Dinamo București
Divizia A: 1974–75, 1976–77, 1981–82, 1982–83
Cupa României: 1981–82

Individual
Divizia A top scorer: 1974–75, 1975–76, 1976–77, 1977–78
European Golden Shoe: 1974–75, 1976–77
Ballon d'Or: 1975 (10th place), 1976 (15th place), 1977 (9th place)
Romanian Footballer of the Year: 1976
Top Dinamo București scorer in Divizia A: 207 goals
Most goals scored in Divizia A: 252 goals

References

External links

1950 births
Living people
Romanian footballers
Romania international footballers
Olympic footballers of Romania
Romanian football managers
Footballers from Bucharest
Liga I players
Liga II players
Liga III players
CSM Reșița players
FCM Bacău players
FC Gloria Buzău players
CSM Flacăra Moreni players
FC Progresul București players
FC Dinamo București players
CS Corvinul Hunedoara managers
FC Unirea Urziceni players
CSM Reșița managers
FC Zimbru Chișinău managers
FC Dunărea Călărași managers
Romanian expatriate football managers
Expatriate football managers in Saudi Arabia
Association football forwards